The Okra Project is an American grassroots mutual aid collective that provides support to black trans, non-binary, and gender-nonconforming people. The organization is based in New York City and was founded by Ianne Fields Stewart. As of January 2023, Gabrielle Inès Souza serves as the Executive Director of the Okra Project.

History 
Ianne Fields Stewart founded The Okra Project in January 2018 with a friend, Nyla Sampson, to combat food insecurity among black trans people. The organization's mission is to hire and train black trans people as chefs who then provide meals for black trans people in their homes. They collaborated with chef Meliq August, who runs a trans chef service. The provided meals are African diasporic cuisines. After its founding, Stewart stated the intention to run the New York-based collective, which operates entirely on individual donations, until its funds are depleted. 

In light of social distancing requirements implemented in New York related to COVID-19, The Okra Project switched to providing groceries to black trans people and raising money for mental health services. As of June 2020, the organization has provided groceries to thousands of people and provided home cooked meals to at least 200. The organization also expanded to Philadelphia and New Jersey due to high demand.

As of January 2023, Gabrielle Inès Souza has been announced as the new Executive Director of The Okra Project. This announcement signals and continues the legacy of such historic moments - a Black Trans Femme lead national non profit in the United States.

Founder 
Stewart is a black queer non-binary trans feminine activist and actor. She has spoken on  the importance of black trans-led initiatives.

Mental health funds 
In 2020 The Okra Project created the Nina Pop Mental Health Recovery Fund and the Tony McDade Mental Health Recovery Fund, named after two black trans people killed in May of that year. The fund pays for the cost of one free mental health therapy session for black trans men, women, and nonbinary people. Jack Dorsey donated $75,000 to the funds, and Stewart stated that the organization received about $100,000 in donations every day over an eleven-day period due to people's donations related to the George Floyd protests.

Other donations 
On February 11, 2021, comedian Nicole Byer won $45,550 for the charity while playing the celebrity edition of Wheel of Fortune.

References

External links 

Official website

African-American history in New York City
Organizations established in 2018
Organizations based in New York City
African-American LGBT organizations
Food- and drink-related organizations
Transgender organizations in the United States
LGBT health organizations in the United States
2018 establishments in New York City